Charles Lewis Beale (March 5, 1824 – January 30, 1899) was an American politician and a member of the United States House of Representatives from New York.

Biography
Born in Canaan, New York, Beale graduated from Union College, Schenectady, New York, in 1844, where he had been a member of the Kappa Alpha Society. He studied law, and was admitted to the bar in 1849.

Career
Beale commenced practice in Kinderhook, New York in 1851 and continued the practice of law in Hudson, New York from 1866 to 1890.

Elected as a Republican to the Thirty-sixth Congress, Beale was a U. S. Representative for the twelfth congressional district of New York from March 4, 1859 to March 3, 1861). He was an unsuccessful candidate for reelection in 1860 to the following congress. He was a presidential elector in 1864. Afterwards, he became a delegate to the Union National Convention at Philadelphia in 1866 then resumed his law practice.

Death
Beale died in Hudson, Columbia County, New York, on January 30, 1899. He is interred at Kinderhook Cemetery, Kinderhook, New York.

References

External links

1824 births
1899 deaths
New York (state) lawyers
Union College (New York) alumni
Republican Party members of the United States House of Representatives from New York (state)
Burials in New York (state)
19th-century American politicians
19th-century American lawyers